Jair José Díaz Villegas (born 3 July 1980) is a Venezuelan football manager. He is the current assistant manager of Atlético Venezuela.

Career
Born in Caracas, Díaz began his career at Colegio Los Arcos in 2003. In 2010, he joined Atlético Venezuela's youth setup, and worked as manager of the under-20 squad.

In September 2015, Díaz was named José Hernández's assistant at the Venezuela under-17 national team. In 2019, he also followed Hernández to the under-20s.

On 1 November 2020, Díaz returned to Atlético Venezuela, now named manager of the first team in the Primera División.

References

External links
 

1980 births
Living people
Sportspeople from Caracas
Venezuelan football managers
Venezuelan Primera División managers
Atlético Venezuela C.F. managers